KYFG (88.9 FM) is an Omaha, Nebraska area radio station featuring Bible based programming from the Bible Broadcasting Network.

In 2009, the then-KVSS purchased KBZR 102.7 FM from Chapin Enterprises of Lincoln, NE for $4.5 million. On June 1, 2009, KVSS moved the signal from Lincoln to Gretna, renting space on a tower owned by TV station KPTM. (Jim Carroll, executive director of KVSS)

On August 24, 2009 KYFG began broadcasting programming from the Bible Broadcasting Network.

References

External links

YFG
YFG
Bible Broadcasting Network